The second siege of Takatenjin came only six years after Takeda Katsuyori took the fortress. 
This second siege lasted from 1580 until 22 March 1581, the siege ended within four months and ended with the deaths of 680 of Okabe Motonobu/Naganori's garrison.

Siege
In 1580, Ieyasu had given up on attempts to capture the castle by assault, but instead built six bases around the castle to keep it isolated. 

Then on January the 3rd 1581, Ieyasu was informed that a force under the command of Takeda Katsuyori was approaching. Oda Nobunaga got the same information and he immediately sent reinforcements led by Mizuno Tadashige.

When the defenders ran out of supplies by March 1581, the castellan Okabe Motonobu led his remaining 700 men on a charge against the Oda-Tokugawa lines in an attempt to break the siege. They were all killed and Okabe Motonobu died when attacked by Tokugawa forces under Honda Tadakatsu.

Aftermath
This siege was quite an advantageous event for Oda Nobunaga, as it weakened his enemies; the battle of Tenmokuzan the following year would come to be known as Takeda Katsuyori's last stand.

According to the source “Shinchô kôki” in all 688 soldiers of various rank joined the commander of the castle in a desperate attack out onto the besiegers, and they were killed. 

In Matsudaira Ietada (Fukōzu)’s diary “Ietada nikki”, the following can be found; “among our own we lost about 130 in total, while the enemy lost more than 600”.

References

See also
Siege of Takatenjin (1574)

Takatenjin 1581
Takatenjin 1581
1581 in Japan
Conflicts in 1581